"Helping Me Get Over You" is a song written and recorded by American country music artists Travis Tritt and Lari White.  It was released in July 1997 as the fourth single from Tritt's album The Restless Kind.  The song reached No. 18 on the Billboard Hot Country Singles & Tracks chart. It was nominated for a TNN/MCN Music award that year.

Content
The song is a slow ballad with an approximate tempo of 76 beats per minute. It begins with Tritt singing the first verse and chorus in the key of F major, then modulates downward to B-flat major for White, who sings the second verse and chorus. It includes piano, timpani, and a four-piece string section arranged by David Campbell.

Personnel
Compiled from The Restless Kind liner notes.

Kenny Aronoff - drums
Sam Bacco - timpani, percussion
Mike Brignardello - bass guitar
Larry Byrom - acoustic guitar
David Campbell - viola
Wendell Cox - electric guitar
Joel Derouin - violin
Suzy Katayama - cello
Peter Kent - violin
Mark O'Connor - fiddle
Benmont Tench - piano, C-3 organ
Travis Tritt - vocals, acoustic guitar
Robby Turner - pedal steel guitar
Lari White - vocals
Reggie Young - electric guitar

Chart performance

References

1997 singles
1996 songs
Travis Tritt songs
Lari White songs
Male–female vocal duets
Songs written by Travis Tritt
Song recordings produced by Don Was
Warner Records singles
Songs written by Lari White